Liu Man (劉曼) was a Chinese Imperial princess of the Han dynasty during the Three Kingdoms period. She was the daughter of the last emperor of Han, Emperor Xian and Empress Cao Jie. She was given the title of Princess Changle by Emperor Cao Pi of the state of Cao Wei.

Biography 
There are no historical records about Liu Man's birth and death. She was an imperial princess of the House of Liu, being the daughter of the 14th, and last, emperor of the Han Dynasty, Liu Xian. Liu Man's mother was Cao Jie, daughter of Cao Cao, the imperial counsellor and King of Wei.

In 220, Cao Cao died and his son Cao Pi succeeded him. A year later, Cao Pi initiated a coup d'état against Emperor Xian. Empress Cao Jie was Cao Pi's half-sister. She tried on her own to defend the imperial seal and the legitimate government of Han, but after many attempts she was forced to surrender when soldiers under Cao Pi's command invaded the Imperial palace, leading to the eventual end of the Han dynasty. After the incident, Cao Pi established the state of Cao Wei and became emperor. He demoted Emperor Xian as the Duke of Shanyang and Empress Cao Jie as a Duchess of Shanyang, and canonized Liu Man with the title of Princess Changle.

References

Sources 
 Chen, Shou (3rd century). Records of the Three Kingdoms (Sanguozhi).

2nd-century Chinese women
2nd-century Chinese people
3rd-century Chinese women
3rd-century Chinese people
Cao Cao and associates
Family of Cao Cao
People of Cao Wei
Han dynasty imperial princesses